Lake Calhoun is a lake in Kandiyohi County, in the U.S. state of Minnesota. It was named for a local cattleman.

In 2015, the Minnesota Department of Natural Resources announced the lake has an invasive species infestation of zebra mussels.

See also
List of lakes in Minnesota

References

Lakes of Minnesota
Lakes of Kandiyohi County, Minnesota